Ponerorchis faberi is a species of flowering plant in the family Orchidaceae, native to south-central China (Sichuan, north-west Yunnan, north-east Guizhou).

Taxonomy
The species was first described by Robert Allen Rolfe in 1982 as Habenaria faberi, although he later transferred it to Gymnadenia. It was later transferred again to Amitostigma. A molecular phylogenetic study in 2014 found that species of Amitostigma, Neottianthe and Ponerorchis were mixed together in a single clade, making none of the three genera monophyletic as then circumscribed. Amitostigma and Neottianthe were subsumed into Ponerorchis, with Amitostigma faberi becoming Ponerorchis faberi.

References

faberi
Flora of South-Central China
Plants described in 1982